Central School District may refer to:

Central school district, a type of school district in New York
Central School District (California)
Central School District 51, Illinois
Central School District 104, Illinois
Central School District (Oregon)

See also
 Central Community School System (Louisiana)
 Central Community School District, now known as Central DeWitt Community School District (Iowa)